Midway, also known as "Tickbush", is an unincorporated community in Franklin County, Tennessee, United States.

References

Unincorporated communities in Franklin County, Tennessee
Unincorporated communities in Tennessee